Christina Shakovets (born 29 April 1994) is a German former tennis player.

Shakovets won two singles and 16 doubles titles on the ITF Women's Circuit in her career. On 16 July 2012, she reached her best singles ranking of world No. 450. On 21 July 2014, she peaked at No. 164 in the doubles rankings.

Partnering Réka Luca Jani, Shakovets won her first $50k tournament at the 2012 Telavi Open, defeating Ekaterina Dzehalevich and Oksana Kalashnikova in the final.

ITF Circuit finals

Singles (2–3)

Doubles (16–16)

References
 
 

1994 births
Living people
People from Lörrach
Sportspeople from Freiburg (region)
German female tennis players
Tennis people from Baden-Württemberg